Dáire mac Dedad (Dáire, son of Dega) is the eponymous ancestor of the Dáirine of Munster and father of the legendary Cú Roí mac Dáire. These further associate him with the prehistoric Darini of Ulster. He is probably identical with Dáire Doimthech (Sírchrechtach), an ancestor of the Corcu Loígde. As such he is a common ancestor of several prominent dynasties of the so-called Érainn, including the Dál Fiatach of Ulster.

His brother, whom Dáire is said to have succeeded as King of Munster, was Íar mac Dedad, ancestor of Eterscél Mór, father of the legendary monarch Conaire Mór.

T. F. O'Rahilly did not see Dáire as distinct from his son, stating that "Cú Roí and Dáire are ultimately one and the same".

According to genealogical schemes deriving from the compilations and works of Duald Mac Firbis and others, Dáire's family can be reconstructed as follows:

 Dáire (mac Degad) m. Morand Manandach, sister of Eochaidh Eachbeoil of Scotland
 Cú Roí
 Lugaid mac Con Roí m. a daughter of Medb and Ailill mac Mata
 Uidnia, a son from whom descend the Dál nUidne/nUidine
 Cindit or Cindfhinn m. King of Pre-Osraige (Crimthann Mor)
 Aegus Osraidi and the Kingdom of Osraige
 Fingile, another daughter about whom some stories exist concerning Dáire's eventual demise
 Conganchnes, sometimes written another son of Dáire as opposed to brother

See also
 Dáire

Notes

References

 Margaret E. Dobbs, Side-lights on the Táin age and other studies. Dundalk: WM. Tempest. 1917.
 Michael A. O'Brien (ed.) with intr. by John V. Kelleher, Corpus genealogiarum Hiberniae. DIAS. 1976. / partial digital edition: Donnchadh Ó Corráin (ed.), Genealogies from Rawlinson B 502. University College, Cork: Corpus of Electronic Texts. 1997.
 T. F. O'Rahilly, Early Irish History and Mythology. Dublin Institute for Advanced Studies. 1946.
 Julius Pokorny, "Beiträge zur ältesten Geschichte Irlands (3. Érainn, Dári(n)ne und die Iverni und Darini des Ptolomäus)", in Zeitschrift für celtische Philologie 12 (1918): 323-57.
 Whitley Stokes (ed. & tr.), "Cóir Anmann (Fitness of Names)", in Whitley Stokes and Ernst Windisch, Irische Texte mit Wörterbuch. Volume 3, Parts 1-2. Leipzig: Verlag von S. Hirzel. 1891 (1); 1897 (2). pp. 285–444. alternative scan I alternative scan II

Legendary Irish people